Otapi is a village and municipality in Ochamchira District, Abkhazia, a partially-recognized state claimed by Georgia. The village lies on the Otapi River. Otapi is noted for its karst cave, Abrskil Cave, which is a tourist attraction in the area.

Etymology
Otapi is also known by several other names such as Atap-Tsarakhmul, Tskar-Khumul, Tskarkhumuli and Tskhar-Khumul.

Geography

Otapi is in the northwestern part of Georgia and in the central-eastern part of Abkhazia. Within Ochamchira district it is in the central-northern area, to the northwest of Tkvarcheli and to the southeast of Tsebelda (Lata). Populated towns within  distance from  the Otapi are the Mramba, the Akhyvaa, the Aymara and the Androu.

It experiences snowfall for a considerable duration of the year. The climate is cold and harsh during the winter months.

Mountains in this area of Abkhazia include Mount Achimedzmakh, Eisirkhu, Atvazhukhu and Beduk. Gora Atvazhu-Khu and Gora Beduk are the nearest mountains, which surround the town, within  distance.

The Otapi River flows through the village and continues south. Mokva River is another river that flows through this part of Abkhazia. Two other small rivers which flow close to the town are the Ulys and the Dzhandzhali-Kvara Rivers.

Population
Before the 1992-1993 Georgian-Abkhaz war, up to 125 families lived in Otapi. The population of the village has declined considerably due to conflict in the region. As of 2010, Otapi contains about 50 houses and buildings.

Transportation

Abrskila Cave
There are two caves of note in the immediate region: Abrskila and Achkityzga.

Abrskil Cave (or "Abrskila") is a notable landmark in the area and it is named after the hero of the Abkhazian national epos, Abrskil. According to Prof. Shalwa Inal-yipa, it is the biggest cave in Caucasia. The Achwats stream flows out of the cave and into the Duab River. The part of the cave which is open to tourists consists of four halls with stalactites and stalagmites. At the cave entrance, tourists can view a waterfall, as well as the Great Abkhazian Wall towers. On June 6, 2010, President Sergey Bagapsh visited the village of Otapi and the Abrskil Cave with MP Zaur Adleiba and the Ochamchira district governor Murman Dzhopua and pledged to provide the assistance needed to restore a tourist route to Abrskil cave. The villagers of Otapi rely heavily on tourists visiting this cave for their livelihoods and selling locally produced farm goods to them. The Abkhaz state-owned company, Chernomorenergo, has been responsible for providing the cave with electricity to light up the tunnels and attract more tourists to fuel the local economy.

Peshchera Achkityzga Cave is situated on the side of a cliff within  distance from the town of Otapi.

See also
 Ochamchira District

References

External links
Otap'i

Populated places in Ochamchira District